The South Western International Film Festival is an annual film festival in Sarnia, Ontario. Launched in 2015, the festival programs a lineup of Canadian and international films in November each year, at the city's Imperial Theatre and Judith & Norman Alix Art Gallery.

The inaugural festival was opened with a gala screening of Into the Forest, a film by Sarnia native Patricia Rozema.

Due to the COVID-19 pandemic in Canada, the 2020 festival was staged online. The 2020 festival included a retrospective program of the work of Sami Khan, a filmmaker from Sarnia whose short documentary film St. Louis Superman was an Academy Award nominee for Best Documentary (Short Subject) at the 92nd Academy Awards.

The festival's longtime executive director was Ravi Srinivasan, until his death in January 2023. He was also an associate programmer with the Toronto International Film Festival, specializing in South Asian and Philippine films.

References

External links

Film festivals in Ontario
Film festivals established in 2015
Sarnia